The Sapp House is a historic site in Panama City, Florida. It is located at 224 3rd Court. On October 4, 2003, it was added to the U.S. National Register of Historic Places.

References

External links
 Bay County listings at National Register of Historic Places

Houses on the National Register of Historic Places in Florida
Buildings and structures in Panama City, Florida
Houses in Bay County, Florida
National Register of Historic Places in Bay County, Florida